Ardestan County is in Isfahan province, Iran. The capital of the county is the city of Ardestan. At the 2006 census, the county's population was 43,585 in 12,587 households. The following census in 2011 counted 41,405 people in 12,930 households. At the 2016 census, the county's population was 42,105 in 14,140 households.

Administrative divisions

The population history of Ardestan County's administrative divisions over three consecutive censuses is shown in the following table. The latest census shows two districts, seven rural districts, and three cities.

References

 

Counties of Isfahan Province